Audruicq is a commune in the Pas-de-Calais department in northern France.

Geography
A town located 11 miles (18 km) southeast of Calais, at the junction of the D224 with the D309 road.

History
Baldwin II, Count of Flanders named it a city in 1175, rebuilding the castle and converting the surrounding marshland to tillable soil.
After continuously changing authority between the 13th century and the 17th century, Audruicq finally became a French town after the Peace of Nijmegen in 1678.

Population

Sights
 The eighteenth-century church of St. Martin.
 The eighteenth-century château.

Personalities
 Gilbert Brazy: Born at Audruicq on 15 February 1902. A pilot, he disappeared, flying a  "Latham47" in the Arctic in 1928 with Roald Amundsen.1

International relations
Audruicq is twinned with:
 Hawkhurst in Kent, England, since 1998.

See also
Communes of the Pas-de-Calais department

References

External links

 Audruicq, a stroll in the past
 The German Air Force in the Great War The 1916 bombing of the ammunition dump at Audruicq

Communes of Pas-de-Calais